Flagg is an unincorporated community in the southeastern portion of Ogle County in Flagg Township, Illinois, United States. It may be found at the crossroads of Grange and Titus Roads.

History
Flagg took its name from its location in Flagg Township. The Flagg post office was discontinued in 1917.

References

External links 

 NACo

Unincorporated communities in Ogle County, Illinois
Unincorporated communities in Illinois